The Reinado de El Salvador is a national beauty pageant in El Salvador. This pageant is not related to Nuestra Belleza El Salvador pageant.

History
Began in 2007, the Reinado de El Salvador acquired major franchises in El Salvador for women and men. The Reinado El Salvador Organization is purposing to spread the beauty and values of Salvadoran women to the world, to give support to excel through our personal preparation classes, promote culture, traditions, and Tourism custumbres our country in major beauty events worldwide. 

In March 2017 the organization acquired the Miss Universe license and in November 2018 also acquired the Miss World license.

Miss Universe 2023
In 2023 El Salvador hosted Miss Universe pageant for the second time.

Titles
Note that the year designates the time Reinado de El Salvador has acquired that particular pageant franchise.

Miss El Salvador
Big Four international beauty pageants:
 Miss Universe (2017 - Present)
 Miss World (2018-Present)
 Miss International (2007 - 2018) 
 Miss Earth (2007 - 2015)
Minor international beauty pageants:
 Miss Intercontinental (2009 - Present)
 Miss Supranational (2011 - 2017)
 Miss Tourism Queen International (2007 - 2009)
 Miss Tourism International (2012)
 World Miss University (2007 - 2014, 2022 - Present)
 Reina Hispanoamericana (2007 - 2016)
 Top Model of the World (2007 - 2016)

Mister El Salvador
 Mister World (2017 – Present)
 Mister International (2007 - Present)
 Manhunt International (2007 – Present)
 Mister Worldwide (2015 - Present) 
 Mister Model International 
 Mister Globe

Titleholders
The following is a list of winners since Reinado de El Salvador took the franchise of Miss Universe, Miss World, Miss International and Miss Earth.
Titleholders under Reinado de El Salvador org.
 Miss Universe El Salvador 
 Reinado de El Salvador has started to send a Miss Universo El Salvador to Miss Universe from 2017. Between 1954 and 2005 Miss El Salvador Organization franchised the Miss Universe to the main winner and after it renamed as "Nuestra Belleza El Salvador" from 2006 to 2015. On occasion, when the winner does not qualify (due to age) for either contest, a runner-up is sent. Miss World El Salvador Reinado de El Salvador has started to send a Miss Mundo El Salvador to Miss World from 2018. Between 1975 and 2005 Miss El Salvador Organization franchised the Miss World to the 1st Runner-up or sometimes winner and after it renamed as "Nuestra Belleza El Salvador" from 2006 to 2017.Past titleholders under Reinado de El Salvador org.
 Miss International El Salvador Reinado de El Salvador sent representatives from 2007 through 2017 to Miss International. Between 1992 and 1995 Miss El Salvador Organization franchised the Miss International to the 2nd Runner-up and an independent selection between 2004 and 2005 as "Miss International El Salvador". The Miss International license is the first major pageant when the Reinado de El Salvador had built a competition in 2007. In 2019, the franchise was awarded to Francisco Cortez who runs another national beauty pageant in El Salvador.''

Miss Tierra El Salvador

References

External links
www.reinadodeelsalvador.com

Recurring events established in 2007
2007 establishments in El Salvador
Salvadoran awards 
Beauty pageants in El Salvador
El Salvador